Radio is the debut studio album by American rapper LL Cool J. It was released on November 18, 1985, by Def Jam Recordings and Columbia Records. It was also Def Jam's first full-length album release.

The album was recorded at Chung King House of Metal in New York City with producer Rick Rubin, who provided a sparse, minimal production style. The album also features a sound punctuated by DJ scratching, often brief samples, and emphasis of the downbeat. LL Cool J's aggressive b-boy lyrics explored themes of inner city culture, teenage promiscuity, and braggadocio raps.

A significant sales success for a hip hop record at the time, Radio became a Billboard chart hit and sold over 500,000 copies within its first five months of release. By 1989, it had been certified platinum by the Recording Industry Association of America for sales surpassing one million copies in the United States. Initial reception of the album was generally positive, with praise given to LL Cool J's lyricism and Rubin's production. It has since been recognized by critics as LL Cool J's best album.

Radio belonged to a pivotal moment in hip hop's culture and history, reflecting the new school and ghettoblaster subculture in the United States during the mid-1980s. The album's success contributed to the displacement of the old school with the new school form and to the genre's mainstream success during this period. It was also a career breakthrough for LL Cool J and Rick Rubin. Radio has been recognized by music journalists as one of the first artistically cohesive and commercially successful hip hop albums.

Background 
In March 1984, when NYU student Rick Rubin and promoter-manager Russell Simmons founded the then-independent Def Jam label, 16 year–old St. Albans, Queens native James Todd Smith was creating demo tapes in his grandparents' home. His grandfather, a jazz saxophonist, purchased him $2,000 worth of stereo equipment, including two turntables, an audio mixer and an amplifier. Smith later discussed his childhood background and rapping, stating that "By the time I got that equipment, I was already a rapper. In this neighborhood, the kids grow up in rap. It's like speaking Spanish if you grow up in an all-Spanish house. I got into it when I was about 9, and since then all I wanted was to make a record and hear it on the radio." By using the mixing table he had received from his grandfather, Smith produced and mixed his own demos and sent them to various record companies throughout New York City, including Simmons' and Rubin's own Def Jam Recordings.

Under his new stage name, LL Cool J (an acronym for "Ladies Love Cool James"), Smith was signed by Def Jam, which led to the release of his first official record, the 12-inch single "I Need a Beat" (1984). The single was a hard-hitting, streetwise b-boy song with spare beats and ballistic rhymes. Smith later discussed his search for a label, stating "I sent my demo to many different companies, but it was Def Jam where I found my home." That same year, Smith made his professional debut concert performance at Manhattan Center High School. In a later interview, LL Cool J recalled the experience, stating "They pushed the lunch room tables together and me and my DJ, Cut Creator, started playing. ... As soon as it was over there were girls screaming and asking for autographs. Right then and there I said, 'This is what I want to do'." LL's debut single sold over 100,000 copies and helped establish both Def Jam as a label and Smith as a rapper. The commercial success of "I Need a Beat" – along with the Beastie Boys' "Rock Hard" (1984) – helped Def Jam to a distribution deal with Columbia Records the following year.

LL dropped out of Andrew Jackson High School in Queens to record his first studio album, also the first LP to be issued by Def Jam. Recording sessions for the album took place at Chung King Studios in Manhattan's Chinatown under Rubin's direction. "There were no expectations," the producer recalled. "Everything was done through trial and error. As long as it sounded good, it didn't matter how technically wrong it might be."

Notable among the personnel was LL's DJ Jay Philpot, better known as Cut Creator. A Queens native and former trombonist, Philpot met LL at a block party, and they began performing together. The audio mastering was handled by engineer Herb Powers at 130 West 42nd Street in the Frankford Wayne Mastering Labs and the album was set for release as Radio in November 1985, containing a dedication in the liner notes to LL's mother and grandparents. 

The album's release had been anticipated by many rap fans following LL's appearance in the hip hop movie Krush Groove, which was based on the beginnings of the Def Jam label and featured the single "I Can't Live Without My Radio" from Radio.

Music and lyrics 
The album's production, handled entirely by Rick Rubin with a remix by DJ Jazzy Jay, has been noted by critics and music writers for Rubin's minimalist style and stripped-down aggressiveness. Steve Huey of AllMusic described the production for Radio as "bare-bones" and "skeletal", while calling the instrumentation "basically just a cranked-up beatbox." The sound of Radio is mostly punctuated by DJ scratching and features occasional brief samples, which emphasize a downbeat. In summing up the musical style of Radio, Huey stated "The result is rap at its most skeletal, with a hard-hitting, street-level aggression that perfectly matches LL's cocksure teenage energy."

The lyrical themes regarding the culture and the way of life of inner city youth that surface in Radio, including the growing and popular b-boy attitude ("I Can't Live Without My Radio", "Rock the Bells") and teenage promiscuity ("Dear Yvette"), along with LL's "teenage energy", as described by writer Nelson George, helped appeal to a younger music audience and were essential in the album's commercial success. LL Cool J's lyricism on Radio is highlighted by clever disses, playful boasts and braggadocio raps. Columnist Stephen Holden of The New York Times described LL Cool J as "a brawny young giant with the animal magnetism and amiable self-assurance of the young Muhammad Ali." "I Want You" and "I Can Give You More" have been recognized by listeners of hip hop as the first hip-hop ballads, and have been cited likewise by several music writers and critics.

Author of the 1985 book Fresh: Hip Hop Don't Stop, writer Nelson George further elaborated on the appeal of Radio to listeners at the time, describing LL Cool J as a "minimalist homeboy who knows his beats", and stating "You can call it rap, hip hop or street, but it really is a way of hearing music—and partying hard—that expresses the experiences and attitudes of a great many inner city kids. L.L. Cool J is one of the best young talkologists around, because he speaks directly to and about his generation over large beats that recall Run-D.M.C., Trouble Funk, James Brown, and funky little bits of AC/DC and Yes ... This teenage music is built around beats, but not just any old beats. It is all about a beat with style, with personality, and L.L. Cool J has plenty of both."

Release and reception 

Released November 18, 1985, on Def Jam Recordings in the United States, Radio earned a significant amount of commercial success and sales for a hip hop record at the time. It sold over 500,000 copies in its first five months, eventually selling over 1 million copies by 1988, according to the Recording Industry Association of America. Radio peaked at number 6 on the Top R&B/Hip-Hop Albums chart and at number 46 on the Billboard 200 albums chart. It entered the Top R&B/Hip-Hop Albums chart on December 28, 1985, and remained there for forty-seven weeks, while also entering the Pop Albums chart on January 11, 1986. Radio remained on the chart for thirty-eight weeks. By 1989, the album had earned platinum status from the Recording Industry Association of America (RIAA), after earning a gold certification in the United States on April 14, 1986, with sales exceeding one million copies.

Radio received positive reviews from both "street and dance music" aficionados and mainstream music critics, including Robert Christgau from The Village Voice, who described it in a January 1986 article as "the most engaging and original rap album of the year". LL Cool J's aggressive rapping and Rick Rubin's stripped-down production were praised by critics who also agreed that LL's lyrics set a new standard for MC's at the time. The songs' lyrics were favored by critics who described LL's songwriting as clever and fun. Connie Johnson of the Los Angeles Times said that he is an integral artist of hip hop's "second generation" because of his "razor-sharp wit". Rolling Stone magazine's Debby Bull was impressed by his songwriting and how its originality lies in the ballads, even though "it's the sassier, dance-worthy songs that make this record such an irresistible party." The critical success of the album would later result in its comparison to other LL Cool J albums, which were not as critically successful as Radio. In his review for the Trouser Press, Ira Robbins called the album a "primary classic of hip-hop's original commercial surge" and went on to write:

Since its initial reception, Radio has been viewed by fans and critics as LL Cool J's greatest work, as well as one of hip hop's best albums. In retrospect, some critics and music writers have given more praise to producer Rick Rubin's contributions to Radio, as well as note the importance of his production on the album. Yahoo! Music's Frank Meyer said that the album was "one of the earliest records, along with Run-DMC, to combine the vocal approach of rap with the musical arrangements and riffing of rock 'n' roll. 'I Can't Live Without My Radio' is a hip-hop classic and this album set the standard for East Coast rap for a long time."

Radio was later ranked at number 2 on ego trip magazine's "Hip Hop's 25 Greatest Albums (1980–98)", number 69 on Rolling Stone's "100 Best LPs of the 80s", and number 71 on Blender's "100 Greatest American Albums of All Time" list. In 2003, Rolling Stone ranked the album number 478 on its list of The 500 Greatest Albums of All Time; it was ranked number 470 in a revised list in 2012. The album was also included in Rolling Stone magazine's 1997 issue of "The Essential 200 Rock Records". In 1998, Radio was selected as one of The Source magazine's "100 Best Rap Albums".

Legacy and influence 
With the breakthrough success of his hit single "I Need a Beat" and the Radio LP, LL Cool J became one of the first hip-hop acts to achieve mainstream success along with Kurtis Blow and Run-D.M.C. Gigs at larger venues were offered to LL as he would join the 1986–'87 Raising Hell tour, opening for Run-D.M.C. and the Beastie Boys. Another milestone of LL's popularity was his appearance on American Bandstand as the first hip hop act on the show.

The album's success also helped in contributing to Rick Rubin's credibility and repertoire as a record producer. Radio, along with Raising Hell (1986) and Licensed to Ill (1986), would form a trilogy of New York City-based, Rubin-helmed albums that helped to diversify hip-hop. Rubin's production credit on the back cover reads "REDUCED BY RICK RUBIN", referring to his minimalist production style, which gave the album its stripped-down and gritty sound. This style would serve as one of Rubin's production trademarks and would have a great impact on future hip-hop productions. Rubin's early hip hop production work, before his exit from Def Jam to Los Angeles, helped solidify his legacy as a hip hop pioneer and establish his reputation in the music industry.

Radios release coincided with the growing new school scene and subculture, which also marked the beginning of hip-hop's "golden age" and the replacement of old school hip hop. This period of hip hop was marked by the end of the disco rap stylings of old school, which had flourished prior to the mid-80s, and the rise of a new style featuring "ghetto blasters". Radio served as one of the earliest records, along with Run-D.M.C.'s debut album, to combine the vocal approach of hip hop and rapping with the musical arrangements and riffing sound of rock music, pioneering the rap rock hybrid sound.

The emerging new school scene was initially characterized by drum machine-led minimalism, often tinged with elements of rock, as well as boasts about rapping delivered in an aggressive, self-assertive style. In image as in song, the artists projected a tough, cool, street b-boy attitude. These elements contrasted sharply with the 1970s P-Funk and disco-influenced outfits, live bands, synthesizers and party rhymes of acts prevalent in 1984, rendering them old school. In contrast to the lengthy, jam-like form predominant throughout early hip hop ("King Tim III", "Rapper's Delight", "The Breaks"), new school artists tended to compose shorter songs that would be more accessible and had potential for radio play, and conceive more cohesive LPs than their old school counterparts; the style typified by LL Cool J's Radio. A leading example of the new school sound is the song "I Can't Live Without My Radio", a loud, defiant declaration of public loyalty to his boom box, which The New York Times described as "quintessential rap in its directness, immediacy and assertion of self". It was featured in the film Krush Groove (1985), which was based on the rise of Def Jam and new school acts such as Run-D.M.C. and the Fat Boys.

The energy and hardcore delivery and musical style of rapping featured on Radio, as well as other new school recordings by artists such as Run-D.M.C., Schooly D, T La Rock and Steady B, proved to be influential to hip hop acts of the "golden age" such as Boogie Down Productions and Public Enemy. The decline of the old school form of hip hop also led to the closing of Sugar Hill Records, one of the labels that helped contribute to early hip-hop and that, coincidentally, rejected LL's demo tape. As the album served as an example of an expansion of hip hop music's artistic possibilities, its commercial success and distinct sound soon led to an increase in multi-racial audiences and listeners, adding to the legacy of the album and hip hop as well.

Track listing
All tracks produced by Rick Rubin, except "I Need a Beat", produced by Rubin and Jazzy Jay.

Personnel 
Musicians
 James Todd Smith – Vocals (Credited as L.L. Cool J)
 Jay Philpot – DJ (Credited as DJ Cut Creator)
 Russell Rush – Guest vocals track 9

Production
 Rick Rubin – Producer
 Jazzy Jay – Producer on track 8
 Steve Ett – Recording engineer
 Steve Byram – Album cover design
 Nelson George – Liner notes
 Herb Powers Jr. – Mastering engineer
 Josh Cheuse, Janette Beckman – Liner photography (Credited on the reissue)

Charts

Certifications

See also 
 Album era
 New school hip hop

References

Bibliography

External links 
 Radio at Discogs
 Lyrics at Yahoo! Music
 LL Cool J on Soul Train at YouTube

1985 debut albums
LL Cool J albums
Def Jam Recordings albums
Boombox culture
Albums produced by Jazzy Jay
Albums produced by Rick Rubin
Albums recorded at Chung King Studios